H/ACA ribonucleoprotein complex subunit 1 is a protein that in humans is encoded by the GAR1 gene.

Function 

This gene is a member of the H/ACA snoRNPs (small nucleolar ribonucleoproteins) gene family. snoRNPs are involved in various aspects of rRNA processing and modification and have been classified into two families: C/D and H/ACA. The H/ACA snoRNPs also include the DKC1, NOLA2 and NOLA3 proteins. These four H/ACA snoRNP proteins localize to the dense fibrillar components of nucleoli and to coiled (Cajal) bodies in the nucleus. Both 18S rRNA production and rRNA pseudouridylation are impaired if any one of the four proteins is depleted. These four H/ACA snoRNP proteins are also components of the telomerase complex. The encoded protein of this gene contains two glycine- and arginine-rich domains and is related to Saccharomyces cerevisiae Gar1p. Two splice variants have been found for this gene.

Interactions 

Nucleolar protein, member A1 has been shown to interact with SMN1.

References

Further reading